Najmunnissa Ismail is a Pakistani former cricketer who played as a opening batter and wicket-keeper. She appeared in two One Day Internationals for Pakistan in 1997, both on the side's first ever international tour, of Australia and New Zealand.

Najmunnissa faced the first over of the first ever international match played by a Pakistan women's side, playing it out for a maiden, but was later dismissed without scoring.

References

External links
 
 

Living people
Date of birth missing (living people)
Year of birth missing (living people)
Place of birth missing (living people)
Pakistani women cricketers
Pakistan women One Day International cricketers